Jiří Drtina (born March 1, 1985 in Prague) is a Czech professional ice hockey defenceman. He played with HC Kladno in the Czech Extraliga during the 2010–11 Czech Extraliga season.

References

External links

1985 births
Czech ice hockey defencemen
Rytíři Kladno players
Living people
Ice hockey people from Prague
HC Slavia Praha players
BK Havlíčkův Brod players
IHC Písek players
Guelph Storm players
Piráti Chomutov players
VHK Vsetín players
HK Dukla Trenčín players
HC Karlovy Vary players
Czech expatriate ice hockey players in Slovakia
Czech expatriate ice hockey players in Canada